Thomas Pratt (November 8, 1898 – August 4, 1973) was an American film editor.

Biography 
Born in Santa Barbara, California, Pratt was active as an editor from 1928 through 1959, apparently exclusively for Warner Brothers.  His films include:

Filmography 
 Sensation Seekers (1927)
 The Terror (1928)
 Glorious Betsy (1928)
 On Trial (1928)
 Hearts in Exile (1929)
 The Redeeming Sin (1929)
 The Gamblers (1929)
 Tiger Shark (1932)
 The Crowd Roars (1932)
 42nd Street (1933)
 Elmer, the Great (1933)
 Wild Boys of the Road (1933)
 Lawyer Man (1933)
 Mandalay (1934)
 Murder in the Clouds (1934)
 Desirable (1934)
 Alibi Ike (1935)
 The Widow from Monte Carlo (1935)
 The Florentine Dagger (1935)
 The Golden Arrow (1936)
 The Walking Dead (1936)
 The Return of Doctor X (1939)
 Shadows on the Stairs (1941)
 The Hard Way (1943)
 Tembo (1952)
 Miss Robin Crusoe (1953)
 Loves of Three Queens (1954)
 Jet Over the Atlantic (1959)

References 

 imdb biography page

1898 births
1973 deaths
People from Santa Barbara, California
American film editors